Koda Kumi Live Tour 2005: First Things (stylized as KODA KUMI LIVE TOUR 2005 ~first things~ Deluxe Edition) concert DVD was recorded during her corresponding concert tour for her first compilation album, Best ~first things~. It was Kumi Koda's second tour, her first being secret ~First Class Limited Live~, which had been in correspondence of her secret album.

Information
Kumi Koda (known as Koda Kumi in Japan) is a Japanese singer-songwriter from Kyoto and, at the time of the concert's release, was known for urban and R&B genres. The first leg of the tour was originally released on the second DVD to her Best ~second session~ album. The concert DVD, however, contained the full tour, including the encore, along with behind the scenes and an interview with the dancers and Kumi herself. The second DVD also held a digest for her next tour, Live Tour 2006–2007 ~second session~.

The opening video on the first DVD was filmed outside of Osaka-jō Hall near Osaka Castle in Chūō-ku, Osaka. 

Limited editions of the DVD included a twelve-page booklet.

Track list
(Official track list)

DVD1: Live Tour 2005 ~first things~
0. "Opening movie at OSAKA"
 "Butterfly"
 "Cutie Honey"
 "Chase"
 "Gentle Words"
 "Heat feat. MEGARYU"
 "Hot Stuff feat. KM-MARKIT"
 "Crazy 4 U"
 "hands"
 "No Tricks"
 "Rain [Unplugged Version]"
 "Take Back"
 "m・a・z・e"
 "Selfish"
 "Promise"
 "Star"
 "Trust Your Love"
 "Come With Me"
 "real Emotion"
 "The Meaning of Peace" (Single Version)
 "flower"
 "walk"

DVD2: Bonus footage
"Best ~second session~" live digest release party
"Candy feat. Mr. Blistah"
"Someday"
"feel"
"Love goes like..."
"Shake It Up"
"Wind"
"Live Tour 2005 ~first things~" making video
"Live Tour 2005 ~first things~" opening video

References

2006 video albums
Koda Kumi video albums
Live video albums